Triumph of the Son of Hercules is a 1961 Italian peplum film directed  by Tanio Boccia and starring Kirk Morris.

Plot

Cast   
Kirk Morris as  Maciste  
Cathia Caro as  Antea
Ljuba Bodina as  Tenefi
Cesare Fantoni as  Agadon
Giulio Donnini as  Omnes
Attilio Dottesio as  Arsino
Carla Calò as Yalis, the Oracle 
Aldo Bufi Landi as  Thermail

References

External links

   
1960s adventure films
Peplum films 
Films directed by Tanio Boccia
Maciste films
Sword and sandal films
1960s Italian-language films
1960s Italian films